Chiastic structure, or chiastic pattern, is a literary technique in narrative motifs and other textual passages.  An example of chiastic structure would be two ideas, A and B, together with variants A' and B', being presented as A,B,B',A'.  Chiastic structures that involve more components are sometimes called "ring structures", "ring compositions", or, in cases of very ambitious chiasmus, "onion-ring compositions". These may be regarded as chiasmus scaled up from words and clauses to larger segments of text.

These often symmetrical patterns are commonly found in ancient literature such as the epic poetry of the Iliad and the Odyssey. Classicist Bruno Gentili describes this technique as "the cyclical, circular, or 'ring' pattern (ring composition). Here the idea that introduced a compositional section is repeated at its conclusion, so that the whole passage is framed by material of identical content". Meanwhile, in classical prose, scholars often find chiastic narrative techniques in the Histories of Herodotus:

Various chiastic structures are also seen in the Hebrew Bible, the New Testament, the Book of Mormon, and the Quran.

Etymology

The term chiastic derives from the mid-17th century term chiasmus, which refers to a crosswise arrangement of concepts or words that are repeated in reverse order. Chiasmus derives from the Greek word , a word that is khiazein, marked with the letter khi. From khi comes chi.

If one thinks of the lines as concepts, one sees that concept A, which comes first, is also last, and concept B, which comes after A, comes before A. If one adds in more lines representing other concepts, one gets a chiastic structure with more concepts.

Mnemonic device
Oral literature is especially rich in chiastic structure, possibly as an aid to memorization and oral performance. In Homer's Iliad and  Odyssey, for instance, Cedric Whitman finds chiastic patterns "of the most amazing virtuosity" that simultaneously perform both aesthetic and mnemonic functions, permitting the oral poet easily to recall the basic structure of the composition during performances. Steve Reece has demonstrated several ambitious ring compositions in Homer's Odyssey and compared their aesthetic and mnemonic functions with those of several South Slavic songs.

Use in Hebrew Bible

In 1986, William H. Shea proposed that the Book of Daniel is composed of a double-chiasm. He argued that the chiastic structure is emphasized by the two languages that the book is written in: Aramaic and Hebrew. The first chiasm is written in Aramaic from chapters 2-7 following an ABC...CBA pattern. The second chiasm is in Hebrew from chapters 8-12, also using the ABC...CBA pattern. However, Shea represents  as "D", a break in the center of the pattern.

Gordon Wenham has analyzed the Genesis Flood narrative and believes that it is essentially an elaborate chiasm. Based on the earlier study of grammatical structure by F. I.  Andersen, Wenham illustrated a chiastic structure as displayed in the following two tables.

Within this overall structure, there is a numerical mini-chiasm of 7s, 40s, and 150s:

Use in New Testament
Form critic, Nils Lund, acknowledged Jewish and classical patterns of writing in the New Testament, including the use of chiastic structures throughout.

Use in Book of Mormon 
Chiastic structure is found throughout the Book of Mormon, for example in Mosiah 5:8-9:

8   And under this head ye are made free, and there is no other head whereby ye can be made free.

      A There is no other name given whereby salvation cometh;

          B therefore, I would that ye should take upon you the name of Christ,

              C all you that have entered into the covenant with God

                  D that ye should be obedient unto the end of your lives.

9                D And it shall come to pass that whosoever doeth this

              C shall be found at the right hand of God,

          B for he shall know the name by which he is called;

      A for he shall be called by the name of Christ.

Also reference Alma 36.

A: Inasmuch as ye shall keep the commandments of God ye shall prosper in the land v.1

 B: Captivity v.2

  C: Supported in their trials v.3

   D: Born of God v.5

    E: Pains v.13

     F: memory v.17

      G: Christ v.17

     F': memory v.19

    E:' Pains v.20

   D': Born of God v.26

  C': Supported under their trials v.27 
 
 B': Captivity v.28

A': Inasmuch as ye shall keep the commandments of God ye shall prosper in the land v.30

Use in the Quran

While there are many examples of chiastic structure in the Quran, perhaps the most well known is in the 'Verse of the Throne' or 'Ayat al-Kursi'. The verse contains 9 sentences which exhibit chiasmus, but perhaps more interesting is that it is found in the longest chapter of the Quran, Al-Baqara, which itself contains a fractal chiastic structure in its 286 verses, i.e. where each (outer) chiasm is composed of (inner) chiastic structures reflected in some sense in the analogue outer chiasm. One such analysis of the chapter is shown below (from; alternate and/or more detail analyses can be found in,).

ABC…CBA pattern

Beowulf
In literary texts with a possible oral origin, such as Beowulf, chiastic or ring structures are often found on an intermediate level, that is, between the (verbal and/or grammatical) level of chiasmus and the higher level of chiastic structure such as noted in the Torah. John D. Niles provides examples of chiastic figures on all three levels. He notes that for the instances of ll. 12–19, the announcement of the birth of (Danish) Beowulf, are chiastic, more or less on the verbal level, that of chiasmus. Then, each of the three main fights are organized chiastically, a chiastic structure on the level of verse paragraphs and shorter passages. For instance, the simplest of these three, the fight with Grendel, is schematized as follows:

A: Preliminaries
Grendel approaching
Grendel rejoicing
Grendel devouring Handscioh
B: Grendel's wish to flee ("fingers cracked")
C: Uproar in hall; Danes stricken with terror
HEOROT IN DANGER OF FALLING
C': Uproar in hall; Danes stricken with terror
B': "Joints burst"; Grendel forced to flee
A': Aftermath
Grendel slinking back toward fens
Beowulf rejoicing
Beowulf left with Grendel's arm

Finally, Niles provides a diagram of the highest level of chiastic structure, the organization of the poem as a whole, in an introduction, three major fights with interludes before and after the second fight (with Grendel's mother), and an epilogue. To illustrate, he analyzes Prologue and Epilogue as follows:

Prologue
A: Panegyric for Scyld
B: Scyld's funeral
C: History of Danes before Hrothgar
D: Hrothgar's order to build Heorot

Epilogue
D': Beowulf's order to build his barrow
C': History of Geats after Beowulf ("messenger's prophecy")
B': Beowulf's funeral
A': Eulogy for Beowulf

Paradise Lost
The overall chiastic structure of  John Milton's Paradise Lost is also of the ABC...CBA type:

A: Satan's sinful actions (Books 1–3)
B: Entry into Paradise (Book 4)
C: War in heaven (destruction) (Books 5–6)
C': Creation of the world (Books 7–8)
B': Loss of paradise (Book 9)
A': Humankind's sinful actions (Books 10–12)

See also
 Arch form
 Antimetabole
 Chiasmus
 ABACABA pattern

Notes

References

Sources

Further reading
 
 
 
 
 
 
 
 
 
 
 
 

Biblical criticism
Mnemonics
Rhetoric